Warp refraction, also known as the warp refraction principle, is a term coined by the guitarist Jon Finn in his 1999 publication, Advanced Modern Rock Guitar Improvisation. Warp refraction takes into account the major third tuning interval between the second and third strings in the standard guitar tuning. Warp refraction is the inconsistent tuning anomaly which occurs on the second and third strings of the six-string guitar. All of the other strings have a fourth interval relationship and are tuned as such.

Musical performance techniques